The Province of Padua (Provincia di Padova) is a province in the Veneto region of Italy. Its capital is the city of Padua.

Geography

It has an area of 2,142 km2, and a total population of 936,492 (2016) making it the most populated province of Veneto. There are 102 comuni   in the province.

The territory is usually divided in the capital city, Padua, and its hinterland, formed by the nearby municipalities; the Alta Pianura (higher plain), north of the city; the Bassa Pianura (lower plain), south of the city, including the Saccisica in the south-east; and the Colli Euganei (Euganei hills) south-west of the city. The Euganei hills are the only heights of the entire province, the other parts being totally plain.

History
The borders of the province are almost the same of the Medieval commune of Padua, with just some adjustment in the north-east. The territory was administered within these boundaries since the time of the Republic of Venice, but the modern province comes directly from the administrative divisions of Kingdom of Lombardy–Venetia. The Diocese of Padua covers the most part of the province, out of a main part of Alta Pianura; instead it includes areas from the surrounding provinces.

Main sights
Padua is home to some masterpieces from Medieval and Renaissance art and architecture, while the towns of Cittadella and Montagnana are known for the well preserved Medieval city walls. There are numerous villas in the countryside, a few of them from Palladio, the main ones being Villa Contarini (in Piazzola sul Brenta) and Villa Barbarigo (in Valsanzibio). The Euganei hills offer a relaxing naturalistic site, often covered in woods, while at their eastern slopes there are many ancient spa sites: the Terme Euganee, as Abano Terme, Montegrotto Terme, Galzignano Terme, Battaglia Terme. There is a small part of the Venetian Lagoon lying inside the province, the Valle Millecampi ("one-thousand-fields valley"); and also the river landscapes of the countryside include naturalistic routes, even for cycling or horse-riding. Travelling by boat is possible as well.

Climate

The most part of the province has a temperate sub-continental climate for the Köppen climate classification Cfa); only part of the Colli Euganei have a milder climate, because their southern slopes are above the thermal inversion line by winter, and exposed to the Sun all the year: which allows them to cultivate small olive trees.

The winter is usually moderately cold in the province, avoiding both warm and cold extremes; frost is very common at plain (below the thermal inversion line) with about 60–70 frost days a year, and temperatures usually do not get lower than −8/−12 °C in the plains during the year; but the all-times record for Padua is −19.2 °C by January 1985. The lower plain is slightly colder than the higher plain; snowfalls are highly variable from year to year, and one could see winters with almost no snow as years with frequent snowfalls (Padua has a century average of almost  during a year). Fog is a common phenomenon, even lasting all the day long, above all in the lower plain.

Summers are moderately hot and wet, warmer and less rainy in the lower plain, while the higher plain is often hit by thunderstorms; Padua has a record of +39.8 °C by August 2003, and usually gets above +36 °C in a year.

Spring and autumn are changeable seasons, which may experience wintry or sultry weather, heavy rainfalls or pleasant sunny days. The period between April and June is usually the wettest one in a year.

Extreme events may sometime hit the province. Flooding is a well-known phenomenon since ancient time, so that all the rivers and channels which cross the plain are embanked, and many channels were dug to avoid frequent flooding. The worst recent events were on 4 November 1966 and on 2 November 2010.

Anyway, a really exceptional event happened during the winter of 1608: a snowfall that lasted for 40 consecutive days, from late January to early March, with the snow depth at ground reaching at least 6–7 ft (about 2m) as witnessed by Galileo; a similar event never repeated.

Rarely, between May and September, tornadoes may hit the area as well. The most famous were the one of 17 August 1756, bringing heavy damages to Padua; and the one of 11 September 1970, starting from Colli Euganei and passing through Paduan metropolitan area to end over Venice, an F2 (intensifying up to F4 going onto Venice) on the Fujita scale. Hailstorms are possible as well by summer, the worst recent event having been on 28 August 2003.

Economy

The province has a thriving economy, in the metropolitan area and the Alta Pianura, due to the presence of numerous enterprises of every kind, mainly industrial ones, but also from tertiary and primary economical sectors; these areas are also densely populated. The Bassa Pianura is instead a mainly rural area, thus being poorer and less populated. Tourism is developed above all in the spa towns, while both in Padua and in the other parts of the province it may be considered under-developed, aside from the arrival of large numbers of pilgrims in Padua.

Transportation
Two motorways cross the territory, one being the A4, the other being the A13; Padua has also a highway ring surrounding the city and connecting it to its hinterland. The main railways make almost the same paths of the motorways, going to Venice, Milan or Bologna; but there are minor railways going north (Castelfranco Veneto), north-west (Bassano del Grappa and Trento), south-west (Mantua) and south-east (Chioggia). The main roads follow all those paths.

Sport

Several sports are practiced in the province of Padua. The most popular is football: every village as well as every city parish has its own little team, out of the most important ones playing in the Italian professional or amateur championships; and futsal is widespread too. Rugby union and volleyball are popular sports too; there are several teams also for basketball and field hockey; water polo, American football and baseball are played too. Among individual sports, cycling, athletics, swimming, rowing, tennis, fencing, golf, and horseback riding are often practiced, as well as martial arts.

Major club teams of the province include:
Football:
- Calcio Padova, now playing lega Pro, won 1 Coppa Italia Serie C;
- A.S. Cittadella, Serie B;
- A.C. Este, Serie D;
- Luparense San Paolo F.C., Serie D;
- Monselice Calcio 1926, Eccellenza Veneto, played up to Serie C;
- Unione Sportiva Luparense, Promozione, played up to Serie C;
- A.S. Petrarca Calcio, Seconda Categoria, played up to Prima Divisione;
- Ženský Padova, Serie B, women's football;
- no more existing: Gamma 3 Padova won 2 times the championship and 1 the Coppa Italia.
Futsal:
- Luparense Calcio a 5, Serie A1, won 3 times the championship, 2 the Coppa Italia and 3 Supercoppa;
- Petrarca Calcio a 5, Serie B.
Rugby union:
- Petrarca Rugby, Top12, won 12 times the championship (last time 2011) and 2 times the Coppa Italia;
- Roccia Rugby, Serie A;
- CUS Padova Rugby, Serie B;
- Valsugana Rugby, men's rugby Serie C, women's rugby Serie A;
- Ercole Monselice, Serie C;
- no more existing: Fiamme Oro Padova, won 5 times the championship and 4 times the Coppa Italia.
Volleyball:
- Pallavolo Padova, Serie A1, won 1 CEV Cup;
- Silvolley Trebaseleghe, Serie B1;
- Megius Volley Club Padova, women's volleyball Serie C.
Water Polo:
- Plebiscito Padova, men's Serie A2, women's Serie A1.
Field Hockey:
- CUS Padova Hockey, men's Serie A1, women's Serie A2.
Basketball:
- Gattamelata Albignasego, Serie B Dilettanti.
American Football:
- Saints Padova, Campionato A2 LENAF.
Baseball:
- Padova Baseball, Serie A federale. (www.padovabaseball.com )

Main municipalities

The main comuni by population are :

See also

 Colli Euganei
 Padua
 Padua metropolitan area
 Roman Catholic Diocese of Padua
 Tangenziale di Padova
 Veneto

References

External links 

 Provincia di Padova homepage (in Italian)
 Knowing Padua - June 2010

 
Padua